A by-election was held for the New South Wales Legislative Assembly electorate of Illawarra on 9 January 1904 because of the death of Archibald Campbell.

Dates

Result

Archibald Campbell died.

See also
Electoral results for the district of Illawarra
List of New South Wales state by-elections

References

1904 elections in Australia
New South Wales state by-elections
1900s in New South Wales